Training pants are undergarments used by incontinent people, typically young children, as an aid for toilet training. They are intended to be worn in between the transition between wearing diapers but before they are ready to wear regular underpants. Training pants may be reusable and made of fabric, or they may be disposable. In the US, disposable training pants may also be referred to as "pull-ups", and in the UK, training pants are frequently referred to as nappy pants or trainer pants. The main benefit of training pants over diapers is that unlike traditional diapers, they can be easily pulled down in order to sit on a potty or toilet, and pulled back up for re-use after the person has used the toilet. The main benefit of wearing training pants over regular underpants is that if the person has an accident, they do not soil their environment.

Disposable pants

Flexible sides
Many toilet training pants use flexible sides for the wearer to easily pull them off and on like normal underwear. This is to increase independence, make training easier, and are designed to be child-friendly, as well as to make them designed like normal underwear, unlike most traditional diapers in which the diaper is fastened by inexpensive velcro straps, although they are adjustable when it comes to tightness. Also unlike normal diapers, the sides are sold already fastened with the goal of enabling wearers to put them on independently.

Some brands include strong velcro on the sides, the goal being to keep the sides in place while enabling the parent to remove the pants if necessary. Conversely, the sides may be more vulnerable to breaking and are liable to lose the psychological benefit of moving away from diapers.

Leak guards
In addition, all training pants have leak protection for when the wearer wets the pant. When the pant is wet, the urine is absorbed and drawn into a compartment that absorbs the wetness, much like a diaper. This is used to prevent the wetness to ruin any clothing surrounding it, and also for privacy. However, if too much urine is absorbed, it can break open, exposing the foam that absorbs the urine. Many companies have allowed a fairly large amount of absorbency in their pants, mainly to make them appropriate to be used for night trainers who wet the bed.

Wetness indicator

In many cases, a training pant contains a wetness indicator.

This is a set of designs printed in special ink that evaporates from liquid that is absorbed from the wearer-specifically urine, near the area that is most commonly urinated. When the child does wet the pants, these designs smudge to the point that they fade completely to white. This is intended to be an incentive for staying dry and a way to discourage wetting, and to identify when he or she is wet. Such a feature was first sold to consumers in 2000.

Wetness lining
In addition to the visual wetness indicator, some companies have gone as far as to introduce a liner inside their training pants, specifically in the area most frequently urinated. This liner is intended to make wearers feel discomfort or cold upon urination, thus conditioning them to use the toilet. Pampers was the first one to use this feature with their Feel 'N Learn trainers, which were based specifically around the use of the wetness liner. This product and most other wetness liner products are now discontinued, likely due to lack of consumer interest. Most companies that use this feature also use the wetness indicator on their training pants. When Huggies used this feature on their Pull-Ups, they claimed that the wetness indicator is best suited for those who are visual learners, while the wetness liners are for those who learn from feeling.

Designs on pants
Some training pants depict licensed characters that are likely to be recognized by young children.

For example, Huggies has used the Disney Princesses, Toy Story and Cars designs on their training pants. Pampers has used Dora the Explorer and Go Diego Go! on their Easy Ups. The use of licensed characters on training pants is generally used to motivate the wearer and make wearing the training pants more interesting.

See also
 Diaper
 Huggies Pull-Ups
 Pampers Easy Ups

References

Toilet training